Iosif Czako (11 June 1906, in Reșița, Romania – 12 September 1966, in Reșița) was a Romanian football defender. His sons Ștefan and Gheorghe were also footballers, they played mostly at UTA Arad, Stefan was also a manager.

Career 
Iosif Czako made two appearances for the Romania, making his debut in a friendly which ended with a 3–2 victory against Bulgaria. He was part of Romania's squad at the 1930 World Cup playing in the second game, a 4–0 loss against hosts Uruguay, who eventually won the trophy.

Honours
UDR Resita
Divizia A (1): 1930–31

References

External links

Iosif Czako at Labtof.ro

Romanian footballers
Romania international footballers
1930 FIFA World Cup players
Association football midfielders
Liga I players
CSM Reșița players
Crișana Oradea players
CA Oradea players
1906 births
1966 deaths
Sportspeople from Reșița
People from the Kingdom of Hungary